Milson Ferreira Dos Santos (born November 24, 1977 in Cuiabá, Brazil), known as just Milson, is a Brazilian footballer.

Club career

Gold Coast United FC
On December 15, 2008 Milson was signed by Gold Coast United as their third Brazilian, along with Robson and Jefferson.
On January 14, 2010 Gold Coast United issued an early termination to Milson's contract in the best interests of both the player and club.

References

External links
 Gold Coast United profile

1977 births
Living people
People from Cuiabá
Brazilian footballers
Brazilian expatriate footballers
A-League Men players
Expatriate footballers in China
Botafogo de Futebol e Regatas players
Gold Coast United FC players
Tianjin Jinmen Tiger F.C. players
Chengdu Tiancheng F.C. players
Jiangsu F.C. players
Shenzhen F.C. players
Chinese Super League players
China League One players
Brazilian expatriate sportspeople in China
Expatriate soccer players in Australia
Expatriate footballers in Saudi Arabia
Association football defenders
Sportspeople from Mato Grosso